Leng Nora (born 19 September 2004) is a Cambodian footballer who is currently playing as a wing-back for Visakha in the Cambodian Premier League and the Cambodia national team.

Personal life
Nora was born in Phnom Penh. He is of Ghanaian descent.

Career statistics

International

References

External links
 

2004 births
Living people
Cambodian footballers
Cambodia international footballers
Cambodian people of Ghanaian descent
Association football midfielders
Prey Veng FC players
Visakha FC players
Cambodian Premier League players